Choi Dong-soo (Hangul: 최동수, Hanja: 崔東秀; born September 11, 1971) is a South Korean former baseball player and coach.

External links 
Career statistics and player information from Korea Baseball Organization

1971 births
Living people
South Korean baseball players
South Korean baseball coaches
LG Twins players
SSG Landers players
Chung-Ang University alumni